A stool pigeon is an informant.

Stool Pigeon or The Stool Pigeon may refer to:
 The Stool Pigeon (1915 film), a lost American film
 Stool Pigeon (1928 film), an American silent film
 The Stool Pigeon (2010 film), a Hong Kong-Chinese film
 The Stool Pigeon (newspaper), an independent UK music newspaper
 "Stool Pigeon" (song), by Kid Creole and the Coconuts (1982)

See also